Koçarlı is a town and a district of Aydın Province, in the Aegean region of Turkey,  from the city of Aydın.

Geography
Koçarlı today is a small town of 6,534 people and although there is an institute of Adnan Menderes University and thus a small student population, the population of the area is shrinking as people take their families to seek education and careers in Turkey's larger cities. This is an attractive district of agricultural villages in the middle of the Büyük Menderes River valley on hillsides above the Koçarlı River. The main crops are cotton, olives and pine nuts, other activities include grazing animals and producing other crops including figs and chestnuts. Industry is basically factories for processing these crops and repairing farm implements with the exception of an aluminum processing plant nearby.

Places of interest
 Koçarlı is notable for a mosque, tower, and other landmark buildings built by the 18th century - 19th century feudal lords (derebey) of the region who were native to Koçarlı, the Cihanoğlu family. Their biggest monument is the castle in the village of Cincin. 
 The ruins of the ancient city of Amyzon (Mazın), in the village of Akmescit, 30km south of Koçarlı. 
 The Traditional Pine Nut Festival attracts many visitors to the town, held every year at the end of May.

References

External links 
 the municipality
 the district governorate

Populated places in Aydın Province
Koçarlı District
Districts of Aydın Province